The Pride of Jennico is a four-act play based on the book by the same name from Agnes Castle and Egerton Castle published in 1897 by the  Macmillan Company.

The setting is the mid-1700s and the plot revolves around Captain Basil Jennico, an English gentleman in the service of the Austrian Empire, and the Princess Marie Ottilie of Lausitz-Rothenburg.

In America The Pride of Jennico was produced by Charles Frohman and staged by Edward Everett Rose. The play was adapted for the stage by Abby Sage Richardson and Grace L. Furniss with costumes and set design by Herrmann and E. G. Unitt, respectively. The Pride of Jennico opened in New York on March 6, 1900, at the Criterion Theatre on 44th and Broadway, and had a run of 111 performances.

Reception
A review published in The New York Times on March 7, 1900, read:

Three emphatic hits were scored last night in the Criterion Theatre by James K. Hackett, who again establishes his right to rank high in the list of romantic actors; by Bertha Galland, who met a New York audience for the first time and conquered it, and by The Pride of Jennico a melodramatic play that Abby Sage Richardson and Grace L. Furniss have constructed from the chief incident in the novel by Agnes and Egerton Castle.

Opening night cast

 Carl Ahrendt as Janos

 George Alison as Karl
 Frank Anderson as Gottlieb 
 Virginia Buchanan as Lisbeth
 Edward Donnelly as Anton
 Bertha Galland as Marie Ottilie
 Mace Greenleaf as Timar
 James K. Hackett as Basil Jennico
 Thomas A. Hall as Von Krappitz
 Miss Head as Rosel
 Arthur Hoops as Sir John Beddoes 
 James Ottley as Landlord
 Sidney Price as Ismali
 Grace Reals as Michel
 Amy Ricard as Bertha
 Gertrude Rivers as Marie Pahlen
 Brigham Royce as Van Rothenburg
 Longley Taylor as Markham
 George Trimble as Hildebrand
 Stephen Wright as Fabula

Adaptations
Jesse Lasky produced a film version of the play in 1914 starring House Peters and Betty Harte.

References

External links

1900 plays
Broadway plays
American plays adapted into films